When Odds Are Even is a 1923 American silent drama film directed by James Flood and starring William Russell, Dorothy Devore, and Lloyd Whitlock.

Cast
 William Russell as Jack Arnold 
 Dorothy Devore as Caroline Peyton 
 Lloyd Whitlock as Neal Travis 
 Frank Beal as Clive Langdon 
 Allan Cavan as British Consul

References

Bibliography
 Solomon, Aubrey. The Fox Film Corporation, 1915-1935: A History and Filmography. McFarland, 2011.

External links

1923 films
1923 drama films
Silent American drama films
Films directed by James Flood
American silent feature films
1920s English-language films
Fox Film films
American black-and-white films
1920s American films